The Bishop of Bradwell is an episcopal title used by an area bishop of the Church of England Diocese of Chelmsford, in the Province of Canterbury, England. The title takes its name after the town of Bradwell-on-Sea in Essex; the See was erected by Order in Council dated 20 December 1967.

The bishops of Bradwell have been Area Bishops since the Chelmsford area scheme was erected in 1983. The Bishop of Bradwell has in his episcopal area 182 churches in 140 parishes. The Bishop of Bradwell's Area – the Bradwell Episcopal Area - comprises nine Deaneries in two Archdeaconries - Chelmsford and Southend. The Archdeaconry of Chelmsford comprises the Deaneries of Brentwood, Chelmsford North, Chelmsford South, and Maldon & Dengie. The Archdeaconry of Southend comprises the Deaneries of Thurrock, Basildon, Hadleigh, Rochford, and Southend-on-Sea.

The Bishop of Bradwell has his house and office base in Horndon-on-the-Hill. The See has been vacant since John Perumbalath's translation to Liverpool on 20 January 2023.

List of the bishops

References

External links
 Crockford's Clerical Directory - Listings
 Chelmsford diocese: Bradwell Area Fact Sheet
 Chelmsford diocese: Our area bishops
 Chelmsford diocese: Map of Episcopal Areas, Archdeaconries and Deaneries

 
Anglican suffragan bishops in the Diocese of Chelmsford
Bishop of Bradwell